Indoor athletics competition at the 2017 Asian Indoor and Martial Arts Games was held from 18–20 September 2017, at the Indoor Athletics Arena. 25 medal events were contested over three days - 13 for men, 12 for women in the absence of a women's pole vault.

Kazakhstan won most titles, with six golds, and were denied a seventh after winning the women's 4x400m relay by being disqualified for a lane violation. This elevated Turkmenistan to bronze, earning the host nation their first ever athletics medal at any version of the Asian Indoor Games, and only their fifth medal at any senior Asian Championships or Asian Games, indoor or outdoor. Kazakhstan's haul of 10 medals was matched by Thailand.

Indoor Athletics was on the Asian Indoor Games programme between 2005 and 2009, and returned at the Ashgabat 2017 5th Asian Indoor & Martial Arts Games after being skipped in 2013.

Medalists

Men

Women

Medal table

Results

Men

60 m
19 September

Round 1

Semifinals

Final

400 m

Round 1
18 September

Semifinals
18 September

Final
19 September

800 m

Round 1
18 September

Semifinals
19 September

Final
20 September

1500 m

Round 1
19 September

Final
20 September

3000 m

Round 1
18 September

Final
19 September

60 m hurdles
18 September

Round 1

Final

4 × 400 m relay
20 September

Round 1

Final

High jump
20 September

Pole vault
18 September

Long jump
19 September

Triple jump
20 September

Shot put
18 September

Heptathlon
19–20 September

Women

60 m
19 September

Round 1

Final

400 m

Round 1
18 September

Semifinals
18 September

Final
19 September

800 m

Round 1
18 September

Final
20 September

1500 m
19 September

3000 m
18 September

60 m hurdles
18 September

Round 1

Final

4 × 400 m relay
20 September

High jump
18 September

Long jump
18 September

Triple jump
19 September

Shot put
20 September

Pentathlon
18 September

References

External links
 Results book – Indoor athletics

2017 Asian Indoor and Martial Arts Games events
Asian Indoor Games
2017 Asian Indoor and Martial Arts Games
2017